Sir William Cope, 2nd Baronet (died 1637) was an English politician who sat in the House of Commons at various times between 1604 and 1625.

Cope was the son of  Sir Anthony Cope, 1st Baronet of Hanwell, Oxfordshire and his first wife Frances Lytton. He was knighted by King James I  at the Charterhouse on 11 May 1603. In 1604, he was elected Member of Parliament for Banbury. He was re-elected MP for Banbury in 1614. He succeeded to the baronetcy on the death of his father on 23 July 1615. On 8 August 1615 he was admitted to Lincoln's Inn. He was High Sheriff of Oxfordshire from 1619 to 1620. In 1621 he was elected MP for Oxfordshire and for Banbury. He was elected MP for Oxfordshire in 1624 and again for Banbury in 1625.

He died in 1637 and was buried on 22 August 1637 at Hanwell.

Cope married Elizabeth Chaworth, daughter of Sir George Chaworth of Wiverton, Nottinghamshire at Hanwell on 8 April 1602.

References

Year of birth missing
1637 deaths
People from Banbury
English MPs 1604–1611
English MPs 1614
English MPs 1621–1622
English MPs 1624–1625
English MPs 1625
High Sheriffs of Oxfordshire
Baronets in the Baronetage of England